Barra de Guaratiba is a neighborhood in the Western Zone of Rio de Janeiro, Brazil.

It borders Guaratiba, Vargem Grande, Recreio dos Bandeirantes and Grumari neighborhoods. This place is 56 km from Rio de Janeiro's downtown. It is a beachy neighborhood. The Guaratiba Beach is next to it. There are mangroves in the surroundings and it is characterized by mountains of virgin rainforest and over 100 restaurants and bars specializing in seafood and it is the best place and the cheapest corner in Rio de Janeiro to eat this kind of food.

External links

 - Roberto Burle Marx's Site - IPHAN
 - Typical Restaurant in Region, Tia Penha
 - SeaFood served in Neighborhood
 - Tropicana Restaurant
 - Garoupão Restaurant
 - Rancho Petisco Restaurant
 - Restaurant between Grumari and Barra de Guaratiba´s borders
 - Tia Joana
 - Sobre as Ondas 2
 - Neighborhood´s Tourism Guide

Neighbourhoods in Rio de Janeiro (city)